Naayika is a 2011 Malayalam drama film directed by Jayaraj. The film stars Urvasi Sharada, Jayaram, Padmapriya and Mamta Mohandas in the lead roles.

Plot
Naayika tells the life and times of a yesterdays' heroine of Malayalam cinema. It is the story of Gracy a leading star until she suddenly disappeared from the silver screen. Gracy loves Anand. Anand was playing roles as the evergreen star Prem Nazir. when he suddenly has a disease with his blood. He loses too much of his blood by his nose, and dies during his last film with his coming bride. She stops acting and disappears from the silver screen.  She would like to adopt a young girl. But the young girl wants to star in the next film Gracy stars. But her dress falls off and she goes nude and it appears on the film. She begs for the negative clip from the producer but he wants her instead.  But when the film is released, the negative clip was still there which broke her heart. And she told the producer that she will disclose his intentions to the public. This made him conscious and made him think to kill her. He ordered her make up man to put poison on her lipstick and kill her. She has the poison on her lips and dies. This results in Gracy losing her mental stability. Mamtha comes as a girl reporter and tries to investigate and reveal the truth. But gracy still lives mental, and live for the rest of her life acting unmarried.

Cast
 Sharada (Older) & Padmapriya (Younger) as Gracy
 Jayaram as Anand 
 Mamta Mohandas as Aleena
 Sarayu as Vani
  Nayanthara as young Vani
 Jagathy Sreekumar
 Hakim Rawther as camera man
 KPAC Lalitha as Sister
 Salim Kumar as Young Gracy's father
 Sukumari as Herself 
 Siddique as Film producer Stephen Muthalali
 Ambika Mohan as Young Gracy's mother
 Narayanankutty

Uncredited cast
(Video Shots of old actresses used in title song)
 Ambika
 Jayabharathi
 KR Vijaya 
 Lakshmi
 Monisha
 Seema
 Sreevidya
 Sumalatha
...

Sound Track 
The film's soundtrack contains 5 songs, all composed by M. K. Arjunan and Lyrics by Sreekumaran Thampi.

Production
After the dismal performance of his few previous films including The Train with Mammootty, director Jayaraj  did Naayika. A take on the life of a yesteryear heroine, this film has Jayaram, Padmapriya and senior actress Sharada in the lead roles. The film has Padmapriya playing the younger ages of Sharada.The movie is produced by Thomas Benjamin. Jayaram appears in a role with subtle comparisons with the 'evergreen star Prem Nazir'. The film features songs by  M. K. Arjunan and Sreekumaran Thampi who had composed for many Prem Nazir films.

References

2010s Malayalam-language films
2011 films
Films about films